Michael Robertson (born December 19, 1983 in Plantation, Florida) is a male athlete from the United States. He competes in the men's discus throw. Robertson set his personal best in the discus throw event (65.61 metres) in Denton, Texas on  April 24, 2008.

Achievements

References
 
 trackfield.brinkster

External links
 

1983 births
Living people
American male discus throwers
Athletes (track and field) at the 2007 Pan American Games
Athletes (track and field) at the 2008 Summer Olympics
Olympic track and field athletes of the United States
Pan American Games medalists in athletics (track and field)
Pan American Games gold medalists for the United States
Medalists at the 2007 Pan American Games